On 27 July 2022, hundreds of Iraqi demonstrators supporting Iraqi Shiite cleric Muqtada al-Sadr stormed the Council of Representatives of Iraq building located in the Green Zone in the Iraqi capital Baghdad. The storming, known as the "Ashura Revolution" or the "Muharram Revolution" by Sadrists, came after news was leaked about the nomination of Shiite forces opposed to the Sadrist movement, Mohammed Shia' Al Sudani, for the position of prime minister of Iraq.

Earlier in July, al-Sadr effectively vetoed the candidacy of rival Nouri al-Maliki, accusing the former premier of corruption in a tweet. Incumbent Iraqi Prime Minister Mustafa Al-Kadhimi called for the protestors to "immediately withdraw", and after a public message by al-Sadr to "pray and go home," the crowd dispersed, although they returned a week later after al-Sadr called on them to not miss the "golden opportunity" to demand reforms.

Raid 
On 27 July, angry about the influence of Iran in Iraqi domestic governance, followers of al-Sadr breached the Green Zone and the Iraqi Parliament in Baghdad. Although after a public message by al-Sadr to "pray and go home," the crowd dispersed. Thousands of supporters of Muqtada al-Sadr have been camping in the parliament building since 27 July. On 30 July, al-Sadr called on them to raid the parliament again, and at least 125 people have been injured, including 100 civilians and 25 Iraqi soldiers, according to the Iraqi Ministry of Health.

Siege 
From 29 July to 31 July protesters stormed, occupied and sieged the Iraq Parliament in support for Shia leader Muqtada al-Sadr. Hundreds of protesters were injured in clashes with the Iraqi Security Force. After being cleared from the parliament, protesters organized sit-ins and other forms of demonstration outside the parliament.

Battle in Al-Khadraa District 
On 31 August the Protestors broke into the Presidential Palace in the afternoon, initiating a Sit-in in the Palace, soon however many protestors would be shot as they pulled out of the palace, it is unclear who started the fighting first, However, a huge battle broke out between presumably the Mahdi army (or Peace Companies) and several Militias affiliating with the Coordination Network ( Badr Organization, Asa'ib Ahl al-Haq ), the Battle continued until the afternoon of the next day, and it quickly spread to Iraq's south, Asa'ib and Badr headquarters were forcefully shutdown by Local sadrist militants in many areas, Several people from both sides were reported dead, by the Afternoon of the next day, Muqtada Al-Sadr gave a speech condemning the attack, and ordered all armed operations and any sort of protest to end in Al-Khadraa, putting an end to the riots that continued for months

See also 
 List of attacks on legislatures

References 

2021–2022 Iraqi political crisis
July 2022 events in Iraq
History of Baghdad
Attacks on legislatures